Doña Juana-Cascabel Volcanic Complex National Natural Park (Spanish for Parque Nacional Natural Complejo Volcánico Doña Juana-Cascabel) is a Colombian National Natural Park. The park is located in the Southern Departments of Nariño and Cauca; The park is named after three volcanoes: Doña Juana, Petacas and Las Ánimas. These are in the municipalities of El Tablón, San Bernardo, La Cruz, San Pablo in Nariño Department, and Bolívar, Santa Rosa in the Cauca Department.

External links
The park's page at Parques Nacionales Naturales de Colombia 

National parks of Colombia
Volcanoes of Colombia
Protected areas established in 2007
Geography of Nariño Department
Geography of Cauca Department
Tourist attractions in Nariño Department
Tourist attractions in Cauca Department
Northwestern Andean montane forests
2007 establishments in Colombia